Leonard Herman Gerrit Halle (26 January 1906 – 15 June 1992) was a Dutch football goalkeeper who played for Netherlands in the 1934 FIFA World Cup. He also played for Go Ahead Eagles.

References

1906 births
1992 deaths
Dutch footballers
Netherlands international footballers
Association football goalkeepers
Go Ahead Eagles players
1934 FIFA World Cup players
Footballers from Deventer